The Division of Corinella was an Australian electoral division in the state of Victoria. The division was proclaimed in 1900, and was one of the original 65 divisions to be contested at the first federal election. It was abolished in 1906. It was named for the Corinella gold mining district in central Victoria and was based on the town of Castlemaine.

Members

Election results

See also
 Division of Corinella (1990–96)

1901 establishments in Australia
Constituencies established in 1901
Corinella (1901-06)
Constituencies disestablished in 1906
1906 disestablishments in Australia